Giovanni Stampa (born 18 February 1913, date of death unknown) was an Italian sailor. He competed at the 1936 Summer Olympics.

Career

1936 Summer Olympics
Stampa participated at the sailing mixed 6 metres. He entered the event as a crew member for Team Italy alongside other crew members: Giuliano Oberti, Massimo Oberti, Giuseppe Volpi. The helmsman was Renato Cosentino. The yacht name was Esperia and the sailnumber was I 52.

Team Italy's final ranking was 5th place.

References

External links
  

1913 births
Place of death unknown
Year of death unknown
Olympic sailors of Italy
Sailors at the 1936 Summer Olympics – 6 Metre
Italian male sailors (sport)